The LG LG VX8300 was one of Verizon's most popular mobile phones. This phone contains the following features:
 1.3 megapixel camera with LED flash and self-portrait capability
 Video capture and playback (3GP) up to size of available memory
 TFT LCD with 176×220 pixels supporting 262,000 colors.
 Integrated MP3 player
 Stereo speakers integrated into the clamshell hinge
 Expandability via MicroSD memory cards up to 2GB in size
 Office quality speakerphone
 Speaker independent speech recognition with voice digit dialing
 High-Speed Data Technology: CDMA2000 1× and EV-DO
 GPS Localization using gpsOne

Other technical data include:
 Form Factor: Clamshell, Stub Antenna
 Battery Life: Talk: 3.83 hours (230 minutes), Standby: 384 hours (16 days)
 Extended 1700 mAh Battery available: 5.90 hours (354 minutes), Standby: 593 hours (24 days)
 Bluetooth: Supported Profiles: HSP, HFP, OPP (for vCard), DUN, A2DP, AVRC version 1.1 / supports stereo
 2.5 mm jack
 MP3 player does not support variable bit-rate, good working "Fast Forward" feature
 This is the last LG phone model capable of assigning ringtones for "No caller ID" and "Restricted Calls"

Carriers
 Verizon Wireless
 orange (UK only)
 Vodafone
 H3G

LG VX8300 Specifications
The complete LG VX8300 list of specifications are:

Reception
Sascha Segan of PC Magazine gave it 4 out of 5 dots stating that the LG VX8300 was "An all-around solid choice for Verizon that will get better as currently disabled features are added with time."

References

External links
 LG VX8300 Product information

VX8300